Lyle Neff (born 1969) is a Canadian poet and journalist in Vancouver, British Columbia.

Born in Prince George, British Columbia, he is the author of three books of poetry published by Anvil Press. He has also written scattered essays, cultural journalism and literary criticism for various Canadian publications, ranging from the national newspaper The Globe and Mail to such obscure literary journals as Sub-Terrain.

Notorious for his hotheaded nationalism and elaborate use of profanity, Neff elaborated in 2003 his controversial Three Laws of Honest Dominion Belletrism, a sort of code for Canadian writers. The Laws, as published in Monarchist magazine, went as follows: 
1. Don't ask for subsidies from the Canadian people. 
2. Don't teach. 
3. Don't work for Americans.

Bibliography
 Ivanhoe Station, Vancouver: Anvil, 1997.
 Full Magpie Dodge, Vancouver: Anvil, 2000.
 Bizarre Winery Tragedy, Vancouver: Anvil, 2005.

External links 
  Review of Full Magpie Dodge
 http://www.quillandquire.com/reviews/review.cfm?review_id=4678
 https://web.archive.org/web/20110612174907/http://www.nthposition.com/modestbatsof1993amp.php
 https://web.archive.org/web/20081203191314/http://www.vancouverreview.com/past_articles/rupertjasper.htm
 http://www.booksincanada.com/article_view.asp?id=4721
 http://www.pressreader.com/canada/vancouver-sun/20070113/282471409381966
 https://archive.today/20130205112620/http://www.vancouverreview.com/past_articles/rupertjasper.htm
 https://books.google.ca/books?id=gEeCCgAAQBAJ&pg=PA154&dq=full+magpie+dodge&hl=en&sa=X&ved=0ahUKEwiUhv2k9f3SAhVC0WMKHa_5C4wQ6AEIHjAB#v=onepage&q=full%20magpie%20dodge&f=false
 http://www.pressreader.com/canada/vancouver-sun/20070407/282492884250192
 http://www.pressreader.com/canada/vancouver-sun/20070113/282471409381966
 http://www.abcbookworld.com/view_author.php?id=1371
 https://dooneyscafe.com/dan-browne-eh/
 https://dooneyscafe.com/author/lyleneff/
 https://www.pressreader.com/canada/vancouver-sun/20070714/282406984944520
 https://canlit.ca/canlit_authors/lyle-neff/
 https://www.amazon.com/Lyle-Neff/e/B001K7X5SG%3Fref=dbs_a_mng_rwt_scns_share
 https://www.pressreader.com/search?query=lyle%20neff&author=lyle%20neff&languages=en&in=ALL&date=Anytime&hideSimilar=0&type=2&state=2
 https://www.pressreader.com/search?query=lyle%20neff%20vancouver&languages=en&groupBy=Language&hideSimilar=0&type=1&state=1
 https://alllitup.ca/contributors/N/Neff-Lyle

1969 births
Living people
Canadian male poets
Journalists from British Columbia
People from Prince George, British Columbia
Writers from British Columbia
Canadian male non-fiction writers
20th-century Canadian male writers
20th-century Canadian poets